Léon Poliakov (25 November 1910, Saint Petersburg – 8 December 1997, Orsay) was a French historian who wrote extensively on the Holocaust and antisemitism and wrote The Aryan Myth.

Born into a Russian Jewish family, Poliakov lived in Italy and Germany until he settled in France.

He cofounded the Center of Contemporary Jewish Documentation, established to collate documentation on the persecution of Jews during World War II. He also assisted Edgar Faure at the Nuremberg Trial.

Poliakov was director of research at the National Centre for Scientific Research (Centre national de la recherche scientifique) from 1954 to 1971.

According to historian Jos Sanchez, Poliakov was the first scholar to assess the disposition of Pope Pius XII critically on various issues connected to the Holocaust. In November 1950, Poliakov wrote "The Vatican and the 'Jewish Question' - The Record of the Hitler Period-And After" in the influential Jewish journal Commentary. The article was the first to consider the attitude of the papacy during World War II and the Holocaust, but it was not until 1963, when German playwright Rolf Hochhuth published his play Der Stellvertreter, that discussion of Poliakov's initial investigations in this area took on worldwide significance.

Although little noted at the time, Poliakov's 1951 Breviaire de la haine ("Harvest of Hate") was the first major work on the genocide, predating Raul Hilberg's Destruction of the European Jews by a decade. It received some good reviews. Poliakov said in his Memoires that he refrained from even using the word "genocide", which was considered unfit for publication in 1951 when his groundbreaking work was first published.

Publications 

 L'étoile jaune - La situation des Juifs en France sous l'Occupation - Les législations nazie et vichyssoise (Editions Grancher, October 1999 - three texts: a book of 1949, an article in Historia magazine in 1968 and a text of 1980)  
 , translated 1956 as Harvest of Hate: The Nazi Program for the Destruction of Jews in Europe
 The History of Anti-Semitism: From the Time of Christ to the Court Jews (orig. 1955; this tr. 1966; repr. University of Pennsylvania Press, 2003) 
 The History of Anti-Semitism: From Mohammed to the Marranos (orig. 1961; tr. 1973; repr. University of Pennsylvania Press, 2003) , 
 The History of Anti-Semitism: From Voltaire to Wagner (orig. 1968; tr. 1975; repr. University of Pennsylvania Press, 2003) [preview at Google Books 
 The History of Anti-Semitism: Suicidal Europe. 1870–1933 (orig. 1977; tr. 1984; repr. University of Pennsylvania Press, 2003) [preview at Google Books 
 The Aryan Myth: A History of Racist and Nationalistic Ideas In Europe (Barnes & Noble Books (1996)) 
 Jews Under the Italian Occupation (coauthored with Jacques Sabille) (Howard Fertig; 1st American ed edition (December, 1983)) 
 «Moscou, troisième Rome» Moscow, The third Rome
 «L`Auberge des musiciens» (memoir) 
 «L`envers du Destin» (autobiography)
 "De l'antisionisme à l'antisémitisme" (1969)

References

See also 
 Schneour Zalman Schneersohn - a French rabbi who was active during World War II
 Isaac Schneersohn - founder of the Center of Contemporary Jewish Documentation

1910 births
1997 deaths
Jewish historians
20th-century Russian Jews
french people of Russian-Jewish descent
Emigrants from the Russian Empire to France
Scholars of antisemitism
Historians of the Holocaust
20th-century  French historians